Derrick Hoh (何維健, He Weijian) is a Singaporean singer-songwriter in the Chinese Mando-pop scene. He gained nationwide recognition after emerging as the second runner up in Channel U's Project SuperStar in 2005.

He started his career with Warner Music Singapore and establish himself as a professional singer-songwriter with 3 Mandarin Albums, 1 English EP, and multiple chart topping singles. He is the first Singaporean artiste to achieve #1 on Singapore iTunes Store with his own composition, and achieving a total of 21 million YouTube views for his songs.

Hoh also received awards including the Mnet Asia Music Awards for Best Asian Artiste in Singapore and multiple Top 20 Songs in the Global Chinese Music Awards.

Career
In April 2005, Hoh auditioned for Project SuperStar, a nationwide talent competition in Singapore organised by Mediacorp.

Judges noticed Hoh's unique singing abilities and Derrick successfully made it through to the finalist round. Hoh gained nationwide recognition when he emerged male second runner-up in the 2005 talent competition Project SuperStar. Derrick was managed by Play Music (presently Warner Music Singapore).

Hoh took a break from the entertainment industry for two years to serve in national service. In 2008, Hoh returned with his debut album Unclassified.

In December 2010, he released his second album Change.

In July 2022, Hoh held his full fledged 'Here As I Am' concert in Singapore.

Personal life 
On 1 April 2020, Hoh announced his marriage, which was held on 22 February 2020, with a new single, I Found You.

Discography
Since his debut in 2008, Hoh has released 18 singles and 4 albums:

Albums

Singles

Writing credits
As Composer
"BMG - Be My Girl" by Keung To and Anson Lo (2019)

Filmography

Music videos
Self, Unclassified - Debut 無法歸類, 《無法歸類》(2008)
Self, Unclassified - Debut 無法歸類, 《你走天橋，我走地下道》(2008)
Self, Unclassified - Debut 無法歸類, 《咬字》(2008)
Self, Unclassified - Debut 無法歸類, 《我捨不得》(2008)
Self, Unclassified - Debut 無法歸類, 《碰碰愛》(2008)
Amber Kuo, I amber 愛異想, 《你在，不在》(2009)
Self, 《Open Happiness》(2009)
Jocie Guo, 我是郭美美, 《和我來電》(2010)
Self, Change (Derrick Hoh Album) 變化, 《當我知道你們相愛》(2010)
Self, Change (Derrick Hoh Album) 變化, 《變化》(2010)
Self, Change (Derrick Hoh Album) 變化, 《空位》(2010)
Self, Change (Derrick Hoh Album) 變化, 《每時每刻》(2011)

Television series
IRock
親愛的九月 Dear DJ
The Cutting Edge

Radio
YES 933 午刻乐乐 (Hosting with Chen Ning & Siau Jiahui) (2016)

Awards and achievements

Awards
Global Chinese Music Awards 全球華語榜）年度新加坡傑出歌手 2011
Global Chinese Music Awards 全球華語榜）年度20大金曲 2011
(Singapore Hit Awards) 最有潛力本地新人 2008 {Most Potential New Artiste Award}(Singapore)
(Singapore Hit Awards) 最酷造型獎 2008 {Most Stylish Artiste Award}(Singapore)
(Singapore e-Awards) 最佳本地新人 2009 {Best New Artiste Award}(Singapore)
(Singapore e-Awards) 人氣本地歌手 2011 {Most Popular Singapore Artiste Award}(Singapore)
(新城國語力頒獎禮) 新城國語力新勢力歌手 2011 (Hong Kong)
(Global Chinese Music Awards) Top 20 Song of the Year － 當我知道你們相愛 2011 (Global)
(Global Chinese Music Awards) Singapore Most Outstanding Singer 2011 (Global)
(17th Singapore Hit Awards) 最受歡迎男歌手 {Most Popular Male Artiste} (Singapore)
(17th Singapore Hit Awards) Bioskin最佳造型獎 {Bioskin Most Stylish Award} (Singapore)
(TVB8金曲榜頒獎典禮2011) TVB8金曲榜最佳唱作歌手獎 （銅獎） {TVB8 Music Award - Best Singer-songwriter Award (Bronze)} (Hong Kong)
(雪碧音樂榜|Sprite Music Awards) 最佳新人獎 Best Newcomer Award 2012
(2013 Mnet Asian Music Awards) Best Asian Artist – Singapore (Asia)
(Global Chinese Music Awards) 2013 區域傑出歌手獎 - 新加坡 {2013 Most Outstanding Artiste - Singapore}(Global)
(18th Singapore Hit Awards) 年度飛躍歌手獎 {Breakthrough Award}(Singapore)
Teens Role Model Award (Singapore)

Achievements
(Mediacorp) Project Superstar Male 2nd Runner-up 2005 (Singapore)
(Lianhe Zaobao) Asia Top 50 Idols Rank 12 2005 (Singapore)
(YES 933) Top 20 Charts, Top 10 Male Artistes – 1st Season 2006 (Singapore)
(YES 933) Top 20 Charts, 無法歸類 No. 1 Song, 7 September 2009 (Singapore)
(The Straits Times) 30 Most Outstanding Singaporeans under 30 2009 (Singapore)
(YES 933) Top 20 Charts, 你走天橋我走地下道 No. 3 Song – 4th Season 2009 (Singapore)
(YES 933) Top 20 Charts, No. 3 Male Artiste – 4th Season 2009 (Singapore)
(YES 933) Top 20 Charts, No. 10 Male Artiste – All Season 2009 (Singapore)
(YouTube) No. 18 – Most Subscribed (All Time) – Musicians – 2009 (Taiwan)
(YouTube) No. 47 – Most Viewed (All Time) – Musicians – 2009 (Taiwan)
 Taiwan G-Music Best-Selling Albums Chart – Peak # 6 – 2009
 Singapore Best-Selling Albums Chart (HMV) – Peak # 1 – 2008
 Singapore Best-Selling Albums Chart (CDRAMA) – Peak # 1 – 2008/2009
 (YES 933) Top 20 Charts, 找到你 No. 1 Song 2020 (Singapore)
 (YES 933) Top 20 Charts, 我還是我 No. 7 Song 2022 (Singapore)

Star Awards

References

1985 births
Living people
21st-century Singaporean male singers
Singaporean Mandopop singers
Singaporean people of Chinese descent
Ngee Ann Polytechnic alumni
MAMA Award winners